TV BRICS is a communication hub for the formation and distribution of the information agenda of the BRICS countries, operating through an extensive network of media partners in BRICS member states. TV BRICS international editorial board publishes materials in four languages: Russian, English, Chinese, and Portuguese. TV BRICS combines a medium with its own broadcasting, a coalition under TV BRICS brand on partner channels in the BRICS countries, broadcasting in national languages, and the internet media news site, functioning in a multilingual format.

The CEO is Janna Tolstikova, Ilya Bachurin is the general producer.

Structure
In Russia TV BRICS has technical coverage about 31 million people. TV BRICS has 24 hours broadcasting in AKADO, Lime HD. TV BRICS has its own broadcasting block under Russian TV Channel "Prodvizheniye". TV BRICS Satellite Broadcasting Using the platforms Orion Express and NTV PLUS via five communication satellites. TV BRICS broadcasts Through providers in 55 subjects of Russia and through OTT Platform Lime HD, Smotreshka.tv.

History
TV BRICS was created thanks to a joint initiative of the Group’s leaders. The intention to launch a joint television network of the BRICS countries was stated at the BRICS summit in Xiamen, China, on September 4, 2017.

Projects
TV BRICS is official member of the SDG Media Compact, an initiative marking a new drive to advance awareness of the Sustainable Development Goals (SDGs).

BRICS against COVID-19
The new joint project will involve the UN Information Centers in Brazil, China, India and South Africa in collecting and distributing reliable information about COVID-19. The main goal of the "BRICS AGAINST COVID-19" project is to combat the "misinformation pandemic" and the wave of fake news that the global community has been lately observing. The United Nations pays particular attention to this problem. The dissemination of accurate, fact-based and timely information on the new coronavirus infection, virus control and prevention measures, as well as other vital information is a priority on the UN global information and communications agenda. Experts from the World Health Organization, who have access to up-to-date information on the global trends, will also provide their inputs to the "BRICS AGAINST COVID-19" information hub.

Dostoevsky Intercontinental
The "Dostoevsky Intercontinental" documentary film is intended to reflect the relevance of Dostoevsky's figure, his work and philosophical heritage for the international community, as well as to draw the viewers' attention to the national accents of interpretation of Dostoevsky's philosophy in India, South Africa, Brazil, China and Russia.

BRICS digital world
TV BRICS launches BRICS Digital World, an international digital video content library.

BRICS Digital World is a single international content library produced in the BRICS member states. The library includes multi-genre multilingual video content: television series, feature films and documentaries, TV shows, web series, television documentaries, etc. Content database provides paid and publicly available access. The collected content is cataloged under categories, reflecting all the necessary information for the user: name, description, genre, dubbing language, country of origin, etc.

"Checklist" TV show
On March 31, 2020, the channel launched a travel show called "Checklist". The host of the program was Misha Ronkainen.

Partners
In China: Xinhua, CNC Global, Renmin Ribao, Chengdu Radio & Television, China Radio International, China Intercontinental Press., CCTV+, China Daily.
In Brasil: Grupo Bandeirantes de Comunicação, TV CULTURA, Metropoles, Rede TV, Grupa CMA, ASAS.
In India: Economic Times, Anupama Productions, Indian Insiders, Aaj Tak Media Group, Janhit Times.
In South Africa: African News Agency (ANA), Moja Media Group., Pretoria News.
In Russia: Prodvizhenie, Sibnovosti, "Omsk Zdes".

References

External links
 Official Website
 YouTube channel

Companies based in Moscow
Mass media companies of Russia
Television channels and stations established in 2017